The National Integrated Medical Association (NIMA) is an Indian non-governmental organisation of general practitioners educated in integrated system of medicine which includes study of Modern Medicine and knowledge of ayurveda/unani/siddha with scientific approach.

NIMA is officially established in 1971 with the motive to promote scientific integration of Modern Medicine & Ancient Indian Medicine i.e. ayurveda/unani/siddha.

NIMA is registered in The Office of Charity Commissioner, Brihan Mumbai Region, with registration no. F 2469

First meeting 
The first meeting of the NIMA Central Council was held at Delhi on 6-4-1969 which elected P N Awasthi (Bombay) as the president and K S Potdar (Delhi) as the General Secretary of NIMA.
There is one more information about the first meeting of NIMA which happened in Gwalior in 1964.

Activities and achievements 
National Integrated Medical Association has strongly protested against  Union Health Ministry & MCI's proposal to start new three & half years course (BRMS) for rural health.

References

External links
 Official website
 NIMA Gurgaon

Medical associations based in India
General practice organizations
Organizations established in 1947
1947 establishments in India